The 2015 Canadian Rugby Championship was the 7th season of the Canadian Rugby Championship. The competition took place between June 28 and July 1, 2015. Again, the format for the 2015 season changed with the tournament seeing a simple two stage knock-out series between the four teams taking place in Calgary, for a total of four games.

The Prairie Wolf Pack beat the Ontario Blues in the final; claiming their first Canadian Rugby Championship, meaning all participating teams have now won the Championship.

Teams

Fixtures
 All times local to where the game is being played

Semi-finals

3rd-place play-off

Final

See also 
Canadian Rugby Championship
Rugby Canada

References 

Canadian Rugby Championship
Canadian Rugby Championship seasons
CRC